Metal Max is a role-playing game series produced by Crea-Tech. Due to copyright problems, the series was split into two sub-series, "Metal Max" and "Metal Saga", with Metal Max being generally the main one. Metal Max was initially published by Data East, and later the "Metal Max" trademark was acquired by Enterbrain and the game was published by Kadokawa Games; Now Production and Enterbrain then published the portable versions of the games. Instead "Metal Saga" is a Success Company's trademark.

The first release of the series is Metal Max; it was released in NES in 1991, and it was one of the first open-ended and non-linear role-playing video games.

Metal Max series

Metal Saga series

Cancelled

References 

Lists of video games by franchise